Cristina Maria Jorge Ferreira (born 9 September 1977) is a Portuguese television presenter and businesswoman. Since the 2010s, she has been the highest-paid celebrity in Portugal (earning 232,000 Euros per month, as of 2022).

Biography 
Born in Malveira, a small village of Mafra Municipality, 40 km from Lisbon, in 1977, Ferreira graduated in History and taught it for a few years. Her parents were merchants in local fairs across the region. She graduated in journalism and had prominent television presenters Manuel Luís Goucha and Júlia Pinheiro as her teachers. She began her television career on TVI, having hosted the daily "extra" Big Brother and the news show Diário da Manhã. From 2004 to 2018, she and Goucha hosted the morning talk show Você na TV!. During this time, Ferreira gained status as one of the most high-profile celebrities in Portugal.

From 2012 to 2018, Ferreira hosted the prime-time show A Tua Cara Não Me é Estranha, along  with Goucha. In 2017, she began hosting the show Apanha Se Puderes - which is still on air, as of February 2019 -, which was taped until Ferreira moved to rival TV station SIC, in the second half of 2018. This deal marked the most press-covered TV transference in Portugal in more than a decade.

In January 2019, Ferreira began hosting her first programme on SIC, the morning show O Programa da Cristina, which now competes with the show she co-hosted before, Você na TV!, which is still hosted by Goucha, along with a new co-host, Maria Cerqueira Gomes. With O Programa da Cristina, SIC led the morning ratings for the first time in fourteen years.

In the summer of 2020, Ferreira returned to TVI.

She has a son with António Casinhas, a now-retired football player. She is a supporter of football club S.L. Benfica.

Career on TVI 

 2002: Reporter in Olá Portugal
 2003: Big Brother - Extra
 2003: Reporter in 
 2004–2018: 
 2011: 
 2012–2016:  (4 editions)
 2012–2017:  (2 editions)
 2012:  (2 editions)
 2014:  (2 editions)
 2011–2013: Somos Portugal
 2013–2015: 
 2015: Cristina 
 2017-2018:

Career on SIC 

 2019–2020: 
 2019 -

Other works 

 2007: 
 2009: Part in telenovela Sentimentos
 2010: As Tardes da Júlia, taking the place of Júlia Pinheiro 
 2011: , partner of Marisa Cruz
 2011: , partner of Nuno Eiró
 2011: , partner of Nuno Eiró
 2011: , partner of Nuno Eiró
 2011–2017:   TVI, taking the place of Fátima Lopes
 2012:  TVI, taking the place of Fátima Lopes
 2012–2017: , partner of Manuel Luís Goucha
 2013: 20 , partner of Manuel Luís Goucha and Fátima Lopes

Awards 
 2011: 2° Gala Troféu TV7Dias: best TV host of the year.

References

External links 
 
 Daily Cristina

1977 births
People from Torres Vedras
Portuguese television presenters
Portuguese journalists
Portuguese women television presenters
Portuguese women journalists
Living people
Golden Globes (Portugal) winners